FC Mordovia Saransk is a Russian association football club from Saransk, Republic of Mordovia. In its current state it was formed in 2005, through the merge of Biokhimik-Mordovia and Lisma-Mordovia.

History
The club was founded in 1961. In 2010, the club won promotion to the Russian First Division. On 8 May 2012, Mordovia beat Shinnik Yaroslavl 2–0 at home. This result meant that with a round to spare the team won promotion to the Russian Premier League for the 2012–13 season for the first time in its history. It was relegated back to the second tier after one season, and then returned to the Premier League for the 2014–15 season, taking 8th spot. After the next 2015–16 season, it was once again relegated. At the end of the 2016–17 season they were relegated for the second year in a row, to the third-tier Russian Professional Football League. They returned to the second tier after one season down for 2018–19 season.

On 18 June 2020, club director Nikolay Levin confirmed that the club had failed FNL licensing for the 2020–21 season, and it was not been determined which league the club will play in. The club was not admitted to the 2020–21 Russian Professional Football League either, thus losing professional status.

Name changes
1961: Stroitel Saransk
1962–71: Spartak Saransk
1972–79: Elektrosvet Saransk
1980–02: Svetotekhnika Saransk
2003–04: Lisma-Mordovia Saransk
2005–: Mordovia Saransk (merged with Biokhimik-Mordovia).

Domestic history

Honours

Domestic
PFL Cup: 2009
Russian National Football League (2): 2011–12, 2013–14

Oprita Daniel

Notable players
Had international caps for their respective countries. Players whose name is listed in bold represented their countries while playing for Mordovia.

Russia
 Evgeni Aldonin
 Anton Bobyor
 Dmitri Kirichenko
 Kirill Panchenko
 Viktor Vasin
 Oleg Veretennikov

Former USSR countries
Armenia 
 Artur Sarkisov
Belarus
 Igor Shitov
Georgia
 Akaki Khubutia
 Mamuka Kobakhidze
 Nukri Revishvili
Kazakhstan
 Vitaliy Abramov
 Aleksei Muldarov
 Yevgeni Tarasov
 Sergey Zhunenko
Lithuania
 Darius Maciulevičius

Moldova
 Ilie Cebanu
 Iulian Erhan
 Alexandru Suvorov
Turkmenistan
 Artem Nazarow
Uzbekistan
 Aleksandr Sayun

Africa
Ivory Coast
 Elysée 
Senegal
 Ibrahima Niasse 

Europe
Belgium
 Danilo 
Croatia
 Tomislav Dujmović
Montenegro
 Vladimir Božović

Netherlands
 Lorenzo Ebecilio 
Portugal
 Yannick Djaló
Romania
 Daniel Oprița
Serbia
 Marko Lomić
 Aleksandar Simčević 
 Milan Perendija 
Slovenia
 Borut Semler
 Dalibor Stevanović
 Dalibor Volaš 

South America
Chile
 Gerson Acevedo

Suriname
 Mitchell Donald

Managerial history
 Yuri Utkin (March 2005 – 8 December)
 Fyodor Shcherbachenko (1 January 2009 – 19 November 2012)
 Vladimir Bibikov (caretaker) (20 November 2012 – 28 December 2012)
 Dorinel Munteanu (29 December 2012 – 30 July 2013)
 Sergei Podpaly (1 July 2013 – 9 August 2013)
 Marat Mustafin (9 August 2013 – 21 August 2013)
 Yuriy Maksymov (21 August 2013 – 18 May 2014)
 Yuri Semin (27 May 2014 - 30 May 2015)

References

External links
Official website 

 
Association football clubs established in 1961
Association football clubs disestablished in 2020
Football clubs in Russia
Sport in Saransk
1961 establishments in Russia